Vojnik may refer to:

Municipality of Vojnik, a municipality in Slovenia
Vojnik, Vojnik, a town in the Municipality of Vojnik, Slovenia
Vojnik (mountain) , a mountain north of Nikšić, Montenegro
Vojnik (Despotovac), a village in the Municipality of Despotovac, Serbia

See also

Vojníkov, Czech Republic
Vojnić, Croatia
Wojnicz, Poland